Més may refer to:

Més per Mallorca
Més per Menorca